HM Prison Littlehey is a Category C male prison in the village of Perry near Huntingdon in Cambridgeshire, England. Littlehey Prison is operated by His Majesty's Prison Service. The Prison only holds those that have been convicted of a sexual offence.

History
The site was originally known as Gaynes Hall Youth Custody Centre, and was used as a borstal for juvenile males from 1945 to 1983, when the establishment was closed and demolished. Littlehey was built in its place and opened as an integrated Category C prison for adult males in 1988.

In April 2003 an inspection report from Her Majesty's Chief Inspector of Prisons criticised Littlehey Prison for not helping inmates integrate back into society. The report found that "prisoners needed more help with finding jobs and accommodation before their release", but noted positively that the staff had good relationships with the prisoners and were doing better managing the health care of prisoners.

Littlehey is a purpose-built category C prison for adult males. Accommodation at Littlehey comprises eight residential units, two of which are 'Ready to Use' units, one added in 1997 and the second in 2003. Most cells are single occupancy but there are some shared cells.

Littlehey Prison reports that it provides a range of work provision for inmates including accredited vocational training courses in forklift trucks, carpentry, joinery, motor mechanics, hospitality and educational. Classes range from basic and key skills to degree level learning.

In January 2010, HMP Littlehey opened a large expansion to its current site to accommodate a population of up to 480 young offenders. This investment has allowed for the addition of four new accommodation blocks, an all-weather sports pitch and a gymnasium, adult learning and kitchen buildings. The regime claims to focus on providing young offenders with a portfolio of skills and qualifications to change their futures. Employability and functional skills are said to be at the centre of the establishment's drive towards reducing re-offending. There is also a Prison Visitor Centre which is operated by the Ormiston Children and Families Trust.

In January 2011, a disturbance at the prison left two prison officers injured.

The prison today
In 2014, the prison was re-categorised to accommodate prisoners convicted of sex offences (falling within category C security level).

A 2015 report from the Independent Monitoring Board observed that HMP Littlehey had an unusually high population of inmates over the age of 50 (34%). Concerns were raised over the lack of provision for elderly and disabled prisoners, and reports have emerged of inmates struggling with wheelchair access and not receiving support for health problems such as incontinence.

In 2018 it was found that there were serious problems over outstanding maintenance work, 1,300 maintenance jobs were outstanding in January 2018.  Some showers had been out of action for two years and some prisoners were without heating for 8 months.  Prison officers spent disproportionate time dealing with maintenance problems.  Trust between prisoners and staff had broken down because staff could not meet prisoners' basic needs.  Andrew Neilson of the Howard League for Penal Reform, said, "The lamentable conditions in Littlehey are indicative of the pressures that exist in our overburdened and under-resourced prison system.  No prison should be allowed to deteriorate in this way, but it is particularly shocking in a jail where around half of the prisoners are over 50 and a significant number are elderly and disabled."

In 2019 HMIP inspected the prison and overall, and despite some criticisms, the report reflects some very good findings and some excellent outcomes for prisoners at Littlehey. The prison had a clearly defined function and held a substantial number of elevated risk men in safe and respectful conditions. Prisoners benefited from a very good daily regime and we saw examples of good practice. Going forward, the prison’s main priorities are to assess and reduce the risks of the prisoners it holds, and to prepare those being released for successful resettlement into the community.

Notable inmates and former inmates
 Barry Bennell
 Max Clifford (died whilst a prisoner)
 Stephen Downing 
 Alex Hepburn
 Tony Jasinskyj – murderer of 13-year-old Marion Crofts, imprisoned at Littlehey since 2017, may be released in 2022
 Harry Roberts From 1954–56 he spent 19 months in Gaynes Hall Borstal for assault during a shop robbery. (In August 1966 he, along with two associates, murdered 3 policemen who stopped their car to question him. He was released from prison elsewhere in 2014 after 48 years inside)
 Charles Nall-Cain, 3rd Baron Brocket. | url=https://en.wikipedia.org/wiki/Charles_Nall-Cain,_3rd_Baron_Brocket|

References

External links
 Ministry of Justice pages on Littlehey

Prisons in Cambridgeshire
Category C prisons in England
1988 establishments in England
Buildings and structures in Huntingdonshire
Men's prisons